Directorate of Primary Education is an autonomous government department responsible for the administration of primary schools in Bangladesh. It is also responsible for the training of primary school teachers in various training institutions operated by the directorate. It is located in Dhaka, Bangladesh. Director General Abu Hena Mostofa Kamal is the head of the Directorate of Primary Education.

History
The government of Bangladesh under Sheikh Mujibur Rahman nationalized 37 thousand primary schools in Bangladesh in 1973 through the Primary Education (taking over) act, 1974. The Directorate of Primary Education was established in 1981 to manage the nationalized primary schools. In 2013, Prime Minister Sheikh Hasina nationalized 26 thousand more primary schools. Bangladesh has 126,615 primary schools, 540 thousand teachers and 18.6 million students. Under the Department of Primary Education, there are 8 PTIs (Primary Teachers Training Institute) for long term training of field teachers, 505 Upazila / Thana Education Offices and 482 Upazila / Thana Resource Centers for short term training of teachers.

References

Government agencies of Bangladesh
1981 establishments in Bangladesh
Organisations based in Dhaka
Government directorates of Bangladesh